Onondaga may refer to:

Native American/First Nations 
 Onondaga people, a Native American/First Nations people and one of the five founding nations of the Iroquois League
 Onondaga (village), Onondaga settlement and traditional Iroquois capital
 Onondaga language

Geology 
Onondaga Limestone, a layer of dense limestone that outcrops in New York and Ontario, Canada
Onondaga Cave State Park, in Leasburg, Missouri, named after the geological formation
Onondaga Falls, one of 24 named waterfalls in Ricketts Glen State Park, in Pennsylvania

Places

Canada
Onondaga, Ontario, a rural community in the County of Brant, province of Ontario

United States
Onondaga County, New York, a county near the center of New York State
Onondaga Reservation, a  reservation, which is Onondaga Nation territory
Onondaga, New York, a town in Onondaga County
Onondaga Hill, New York, a hamlet in the Town of Onondaga
Onondaga Creek, runs through Syracuse to Onondaga Lake, in Onondaga County
Onondaga Lake, adjacent to Syracuse, in Onondaga County
Onondaga Lake Park, a park on the eastern shore of Onondaga Lake
Onondaga Park, a park on the south side of Syracuse
Onondaga Township, Michigan, a township in Michigan's lower peninsula
Onondaga, Michigan, an unincorporated community in Onondaga Township

Ships and organizations 
Onondaga Community College in New York
Onondaga Hill Middle School in New York
HMCS Onondaga (S73), a submarine in the Royal Canadian Navy
USS Onondaga, three ships of the US Navy
 The Onondagas, nickname of the 122nd New York Volunteer Infantry regiment in American Civil War

Language and nationality disambiguation pages